Spinal muscular atrophies (SMAs) are a genetically and clinically heterogeneous group of rare debilitating disorders characterised by the degeneration of lower motor neurons (neuronal cells situated in the anterior horn of the spinal cord) and subsequent  atrophy (wasting) of various muscle groups in the body. While some SMAs lead to early infant death, other diseases of this group permit normal adult life with only mild weakness.

Classification 

Based on the type of muscles affected, spinal muscular atrophies can be divided into:
 Proximal spinal muscular atrophies, i.e.,  conditions that affect primarily proximal muscles;
 Distal spinal muscular atrophies (which significantly overlap with distal hereditary motor neuronopathies) where they affect primarily distal muscles.

When taking into account prevalence, spinal muscular atrophies are traditionally divided into:
 Autosomal recessive proximal spinal muscular atrophy, responsible for 90-95% of cases and usually called simply spinal muscular atrophy (SMA) – a disorder associated with a genetic mutation on the SMN1 gene on chromosome 5q (locus 5q13), diagnosed predominantly in young children and in its most severe form being the most common genetic cause of infant death if left untreated;
 Localised spinal muscular atrophies – much more rare conditions, in some instances described in but a few patients in the world, which are associated with mutations of genes other than SMN1 and for this reason sometimes termed simply non-5q spinal muscular atrophies; none has currently a causal treatment.

A more detailed classification is based on the gene associated with the condition (where identified) and is presented in table below.

In all forms of SMA (with an exception of X-linked spinal muscular atrophy type 1), only motor neurons, located at the anterior horn of spinal cord, are affected; sensory neurons, which are located at the posterior horn of spinal cord, are not affected. By contrast, hereditary disorders that cause both weakness due to motor denervation along with sensory impairment due to sensory denervation are known as hereditary motor and sensory neuropathies (HMSN).

See also 
 Distal hereditary motor neuropathies
 Motor neuron disease
 Polyneuropathy in dogs and cats

References

Further reading

External links 

Motor neuron diseases
Genetic disorders by system
Systemic atrophies primarily affecting the central nervous system
Genetic diseases and disorders
Neurological disorders
Spinal muscular atrophy